The Excellent Long-Established University Consortium of Taiwan (ELECT or U12 Consortium), formerly named as U9 Consortium, a university alliance in Taiwan. Its members are nine private universities located in New Taipei City and Taipei City and extended with three universities in Central Taiwan, with 12 universities in total, by cooperation including offering joint academic courses.  Students of Member Universities can cross-register up to  two classes per academic session.

The member schools are equipped with specific strength and academic specialization networking, and viewed as some of historical partner universities or runner-up universities in lieu of comparing academic specialization to top universities in Taiwan, and evaluated among the best private universities in Taiwan.

Rankings

See also
List of universities in Taiwan
University alliances in Taiwan
University System of Taiwan
National University System of Taiwan
Taiwan Comprehensive University System
European Union Centre in Taiwan
University System of Taipei

References

External links
U9 League

2016 establishments in Taiwan
University systems in Taiwan
Educational institutions established in 2016